Parvaresh–Vardy codes are a family of error-correcting codes first described in 2005 by Farzad Parvaresh and Alexander Vardy. They can be used for efficient list-decoding.

See also 

 Reed–Solomon code
 Folded Reed–Solomon code

References 

Error detection and correction
Coding theory